No Friends Of Harry were a South African gothic/alternative rock  band from Johannesburg who were active in the 1980s and 1990s. They released three albums on independent South African labels, with a compilation album being released by EMI Records shortly after the band broke up in 1998.The band has just released a new album in 2020 and still do shows across south africa and London

Band members  
Robert Mclennan - Lead Singer / Guitar
Annette McLennan - Drummer
Dave Devetta - Bass 
Ian Wiggins - Guitars
Adrian Hamilton - Keyboards  
Mark Williams - Manager

Discography
The band released five albums and three singles, as well as appearing on compilation albums with other artists.

Albums
One Came Running (1987), Principal
Into the Valley (1989), Principal
Fifteen Seconds (1991), Clear Cut
Fly By Night (1998), EMI
The Present has Passed - The Best of No Friends Of Harry (2003), Fresh Music
Fifteen Seconds Redax (Remixes) (2018)

Singles and EPs
"Competition Rules" (1987), Principal
"Paint it Black" (1989), Principal
"The Present has Passed" (1990), RPM records

References

South African gothic rock groups
Musical groups established in 1986
Musical groups disestablished in 1998